Ladies Hall in Deptford, London is thought to have been the first girls' school in England. Founded in approximately 1615 by Robert White, it was for aristocratic girls, and they performed before Queen Anne in May 1617. The school taught basic reading and writing in English, and it is likely they covered other skills a lady was encouraged to acquire, in music, dance, and needlework.

One of the young women who danced in Robert White's Masque of Cupid's Banishment at Deptford in May 1617 was Anne Sandilands, thought to be a daughter of the Scottish courtier Sir James Sandilands of Slamannan Mure. The masque was performed while James VI and I was in Scotland, and it has been suggested that it was subversive of the king's authority, after he refused to make Anna of Denmark regent in his absence.

One of Anne Newdigate's daughters, Lettice Newdigate (1604-1625), attended the Ladies Hall or a school in Deptford in July 1617. Her portrait, aged 2, at Arbury Hall, is one of the earliest depictions of an English knot garden.

I. A. Shapiro doubted the existence of Ladies' Hall as a school, believing that it may simply have been where the young gentlewomen attending Anne of Denmark's ladies-in-waiting were housed, and that the ladies there had joined together to perform a play.

References

Educational institutions established in the 1610s
1615 establishments in England
Defunct schools in the London Borough of Lewisham
Women in London